Legislative elections in France to elect the 14th legislature of the French Third Republic were held on 22 and 29 April 1928. These elections saw the restoration of the two-round system that had been abolished in 1919.

The result was a victory for the centre-right government of Raymond Poincaré, which had been in power since July 1926. A succession of centre-right governments followed until 1932.

Results

Popular Vote

Parliamentary Groups

References

External links
Map of Deputies elected in 1928 according to their group in the House, including overseas (in French)

1928
1928 elections in France
April 1928 events